Chincholi is a panchayat town and a taluka in Kalaburagi district in the state of Karnataka, India.

Geography
It has an average elevation of 462 metres (1515 feet). The town is spread over an area of 6 km².

Demographics
 India census, Chincholi had a population of 20,897 with males numbering 10,852 and females 10,045.

Chincholi Taluka borders the following talukas of Kalaburagi district: Gulbarga Taluka to the west, Chitapur taluka to the south-west and Sedam Taluka to the south. It also borders Humnabad Taluk of Bidar district to the north and Tandur Mandal of Vikarabad district of Telangana to the east and Mogudampally mandal of Sangareddy district of Telangana to northeast.

Politics 
Chincholi is part of Chincholi Assembly constituency and Bidar (Lok Sabha constituency).

Two time chief minister of Karnataka Veerendra Patil was from this taluka.

Villages in Chincholi Taluk

Tourist places
Sukshetra Buggi
Chandrapalli reservoir
Etti Potta Falls
Nagaral reservoir and Gottamgotta
Chincholi Wildlife Sanctuary

Transport
KSRTC provides bus travel within Karnataka and the nearby states of Maharastra and Telangana. The nearest railway stations are Sedam railway station and  Tandur railway station. The nearest international airport is Rajiv Gandhi International Airport, whilst the nearest domestic airport is Gulbarga Airport. And nearest domestic airport is Bidar Airport (60 KM)

References

Cities and towns in Kalaburagi district